The 2019–20 Danish 1st Division season was the 24th season of the Danish 1st Division league championship, governed by the Danish Football Association.

The division-champion was promoted to the 2020–21 Danish Superliga. The teams in 10th, 11th and 12th places were relegated to the 2020–21 Danish 2nd Divisions. The reason for this change in promotion and relegation spots was that the Danish Superliga was reduced to 12 teams following this season.

Participants
Vejle Boldklub finished last in the 2018–19 Danish Superliga relegation play-off and were relegated to the 1st Division after only one season in the first tier. Vendsyssel FF lost to Lyngby Boldklub in the relegation play off and were relegated as well. Silkeborg IF and Lyngby Boldklub were promoted to the 2019–20 Danish Superliga.

FC Helsingør and Thisted FC were relegated to the 2019–20 Danish 2nd Divisions. FC Helsingør was relegated for the second season in row following their relegation from the Danish Superliga while Thisted FC lasted two seasons in the league. Skive IK and Kolding IF won promotion from the 2018–19 Danish 2nd Divisions. Skive will play at the 1st Division won promotion after only one season's absence, where as Kolding won promotion for the first time since 2010–11 season, when the club was part of Kolding FC.

Stadia and locations

Personnel and sponsoring 
Note: Flags indicate national team as has been defined under FIFA eligibility rules. Players and Managers may hold more than one non-FIFA nationality.

Managerial changes

League table

Results

First half of the season

Second half of the season

References

External links
  Danish FA

2019–20 in Danish football
Danish 1st Division
Danish 1st Division seasons